An extreme point, in mathematics, is a point in a convex set which does not lie in any open line segment joining two points in the set.

Extreme point or extremal point may also refer to:
A point where some function attains its extremum
A leaf vertex of a tree in graph theory
Extreme points of Earth, points of land that extend farther in one direction than any other part of that land

Physical geography